The 2021–22 season was Motherwell's thirty-seventh consecutive season in the top flight of Scottish football, having been promoted from the Scottish First Division at the end of the 1984–85 season.

Season review

Pre-season
On 1 June, Motherwell announced that Dean Cornelius and David Devine had both signed new two-contract, keeping them at Motherwell until the summer of 2023.

On 7 June, Motherwell announced that Scott Fox had signed a new one-year contract with the club.

On 28 June, Motherwell signed professional contracts with 12 graduates from their youth academy.

Transfers
On 27 May 2021, Motherwell announced the signing of Connor Shields to a three-year contract, from Queen of the South.

On 21 June, Motherwell announced their second signing of the summer, Justin Amaluzor on a one-year contract from Maidstone United. The following day, Motherwell announced the signing of fellow striker Kaiyne Woolery on a three-year contract from Tranmere Rovers.

July
On 2 July, Motherwell announced the signing of Kevin van Veen on a two-year contract from Scunthorpe United.

On 5 July, Motherwell announced the return of Liam Kelly on a permanent transfer from Queens Park Rangers, with Kelly signing a three-year contract. Three days later, 8 July, Motherwell announced that Trevor Carson had left the club to sign for Dundee United.

On 13 July, Motherwell announced the signing of Darragh O'Connor from Leicester City Under-23s on a one-year contract. Three days later, Motherwell announced the signing of Mich'el Parker on a contract until January 2022.

On 24 July, Motherwell announced the signing of Callum Slattery from Southampton on a three-year contract for an undisclosed fee.

On 29 July, Motherwell announced the signing of Juhani Ojala from Vejle on a two-year contract.

August
On 26 August, Motherwell announced the signing of Sean Goss to a two-year contract after he'd left Shrewsbury Town earlier in the summer.

On 31 August, Transfer deadline day, Motherwell announced the signing of Sondre Johansen to a three-year contract, from Mjøndalen, and the return of Jordan Roberts on loan from Heart of Midlothian until January 2022.

September
On 1 September, Max Johnston joined Queen of the South on a season-long loan deal.

On 30 September, Corey O’Donnell joined Albion Rovers until January 2022. Later on the same day, David Devine joined East Fife on loan for the remainder of the season.

October
On 1 October, Graham Alexander was announced as the Scottish Premiership Manager of the Month for September.

On 11 October, Steven Lawless left Motherwell by mutual consent.

December
On 1 December, Motherwell announced the signing of Ross Tierney on a three-and-a-half-year deal, for an undisclosed fee from Bohemians. Tierney joined the club when the transfer window opened on 1 January 2022.

January
On 2 January, Motherwell announced the departure of Mich'el Parker, after his short-term contract had expired.

On 5 January, Barry Maguire signed a new contract with Motherwell, keeping him at the club until the summer of 2024.

On 7 January, Robbie Crawford was released by Moterwell to join Partick Thistle on a permanent deal, whilst Liam Shaw joined Motherwell on loan for the remainder of the season from Celtic.

On 10 January, manager Graham Alexander extended his contract with the club until 2025.

On 14 January, Motherwell announced the permanent signing of Jordan Roberts from Heart of Midlothian on a contract until the end of the season.

On 17 January, Motherwell announced that Tony Watt had left the club to sign for Dundee United for an undisclosed amount.

On 25 January, Motherwell announced the signing of Victor Nirennold on a contract until the end of the season.

On 28 January, Darragh O'Connor was loaned to Queen of the South for the remainder of the season, and Joseph Efford joined the club for an undisclosed fee from Waasland-Beveren on a contract until the summer of 2023.

February
On 18 February, Bevis Mugabi signed a new contract with Motherwell, until the summer of 2024.

On 23 February, Scott Fox signed a new contract with Motherwell, until the summer of 2023. The following day, 24 February, Nathan McGinley also extended his contract with Motherwell, until the summer of 2024.

On 28 February, PJ Morrison joined Alloa Athletic on loan for the remainder of the season.

March
On 28 March, Motherwell announced the signing of Robbie Mahon from Bohemians on a contract until June 2023.

May
On 20 May, Motherwell announced that Mark O'Hara, Darragh O'Connor, PJ Morrison, Cody McLeod, Victor Nirennold, Justin Amaluzor, Jordan Roberts, Liam Donnelly and Liam Grimshaw would all leave the club upon the expiry of their contracts on 31 May, whilst Ricki Lamie had been offered a new contract and Liam Shaw would return to Celtic following his loan spell with the club.
On 24 May, Ricki Lamie signed a new two-year contract with Motherwell.

Squad

Transfers

In

 Transfer announced on the above date, but was not completed until 1 January 2022.

Loans in

Out

Loans out

Released

Friendlies

Competitions

Overview

Premiership

League table

Results by round

Results summary

Results

Scottish Cup

League Cup

Group stage

Table

Results

Knockout stage

Squad statistics

Appearances

|-
|colspan="14"|Players away from the club on loan:

|-
|colspan="14"|Players who left Motherwell during the season:

|}

Goal scorers

Clean sheets

Disciplinary record

See also
 List of Motherwell F.C. seasons

References

Motherwell F.C. seasons
Motherwell